Denny Cottage is a historic cure cottage located at Saranac Lake, town of St. Armand in Essex County, New York.  It was built about 1910 and is an "L" shaped frame building on a fieldstone foundation, with a cobblestone chimney and gable roof.  It features an "L" shaped screened in porch with its roof supported by Roman Doric order columns.

It was listed on the National Register of Historic Places in 1992.

References

Houses on the National Register of Historic Places in New York (state)
Houses completed in 1910
Houses in Essex County, New York
National Register of Historic Places in Essex County, New York